Georgios Bakatselos (Ellinokastro, Mouzaki, 1906 – 23 January 1992) was a Greek lawyer and politician. He acted as an MP and as a minister.

References 

Ministers for Mercantile Marine of Greece
Agriculture ministers of Greece
Labour ministers of Greece
MPs of Thessaloniki
People from Mouzaki
Greek MPs 1946–1950
Greek MPs 1950–1951
Greek MPs 1951–1952
Greek MPs 1956–1958
Greek MPs 1958–1961
Greek MPs 1961–1963
Greek MPs 1963–1964
Greek MPs 1964–1967
Greek MPs 1974–1977
Greek MPs 1977–1981
1906 births
1992 deaths